Sara Gelser Blouin (born December 20, 1973) is an American politician from Oregon. She is a member of the Democratic Party.

Since 2015, she has been a member of the Oregon State Senate from District 8. From 2005 to 2015, she served in the Oregon House of Representatives for District 16, representing Corvallis and Philomath. Prior to her service in the Legislature, Gelser Blouin served on the Corvallis School Board and worked for the Oregon Department of Human Services.  In 2010, she was nominated by President Barack Obama to serve on the National Council on Disability and was confirmed to the position by the US Senate. In 2011, she was named a German Marshall Memorial Fellow.  In November 2014, she was elected to the Senate, taking office in January 2015.

Early life and education
Sara Anne Acres was born in Las Vegas, Nevada, and is the oldest of four children born to John and Jo Acres.  Although her childhood homes included New Jersey, Ohio and Indiana, she lived in Las Vegas for ten years before going to college in Indiana at age 16. There, she earned a BA in history from Earlham College in 1994. She moved to Corvallis, Oregon in 1994.  In 1999, she earned a master's degree in Interdisciplinary Studies from Oregon State University. While at Earlham, she also married Peter Gelser in 1993.  They raised four children together and remained married until 2017.

Upon her July 2021 marriage to Dr. Michael Blouin, a professor of biology at Oregon State University, her legal name became Sara Gelser Blouin.

Legislative career
Gelser Blouin first ran for the House in 2004, and was unsuccessful in her effort to unseat an incumbent legislator. However, when that legislator resigned the following year, Gelser Blouin was appointed to the House. She was then reelected to the House for four additional terms. She served as Chair of the House Education Committee in 2009 and 2013, and co-chair of the House Education Committee during the 2011 session when the chamber was tied. During her legislative tenure she also served on the following committees: House Select Committee on Education, House Committee on Child Welfare, Human Services and Women's Wellness, Health Care, Rules, Revenue, Human Services and Housing and the Joint Committee on Tax Credits. She served as Assistant Caucus Leader from 2006 to 2011, and for the 2011 session served as Deputy Democratic Whip. She was co-chair of the Oregon Women's Health and Wellness Alliance, and was a founding member of the Seniors and Disabilities Caucus.

Gelser Blouin worked on a variety of education, health, human service and finance issues. Her legislative accomplishments include the creation of statewide standards for modified and extended diplomas, the elevation of strangulation to a felony, strengthening the rape statute, improving child abuse investigations through Karly's Law, the creation of a medically involved children's waiver to allow children to grow up in their family homes rather than nursing homes, an overhaul of the state's response to abuse of the elderly and disabled and legislation prohibiting insurance discrimination against children with disabilities and chronic health care conditions.  She played a lead role in the elimination of zero tolerance discipline policies in public schools, eliminating restrictions for school employees wearing religious dress in school, and granting greater autonomy to Oregon's higher education system. In 2013, she successfully spearheaded legislation to ban the use of seclusion cells in public schools.

Gelser Blouin was the only female member of the 2007 "5 Under 35" Caucus. 

In September 2013, Gelser Blouin announced her candidacy for the Oregon State Senate. Senate District 8 encompasses Corvallis, Philomath, Albany, Millersburg, Tangent and the surrounding areas. She won the race with nearly three fifths of the vote and has served as the senator from District 8 starting in 2015.

Personal
Gelser Blouin, lives in Corvallis with her husband, Dr. Michael Blouin, her adult son and her stepson. They also enjoy the frequent presence of Gelser Blouin's three adult daughters.

References

External links

 Sara Gelser's official legislative page
 Sara Gelser Blouin's campaign website

1973 births
21st-century American politicians
21st-century American women politicians
Earlham College alumni
Living people
Democratic Party members of the Oregon House of Representatives
Democratic Party Oregon state senators
Politicians from Corvallis, Oregon
Politicians from Las Vegas
Oregon State University alumni
School board members in Oregon
Women state legislators in Oregon